Samuel Lee Worthen (born January 17, 1958) is an American former NBA player who currently is touring as the coach of the Washington Generals, the team that perennially loses to the Harlem Globetrotters.  He was well known for his play at the Rucker Park Tournament.

Sam Worthen was an All-American point guard at Marquette University from 1978 to 1980 under coach Hank Raymonds.  He led the Warriors in assists during his junior year and scoring and assists in his senior year.  Worthen led The Warriors to a win over 10th ranked on the road against Notre Dame in 1980. Worthen was named to Basketball Weekly's second team after his junior and senior seasons. He was also named to Sports Page magazine's first team, United States Basketball Writers Association first team, UPI, third team and top newcomers of 1979, Playboy magazine pre-season basketball edition.

In 1980, he was drafted by the Chicago Bulls in the second round of the NBA Draft and played in the NBA for two seasons.  Worthen was with the Bulls in 1980-1981 and the Utah Jazz in 1981–1982. In August, 2003 – 23 years after leaving Marquette for the NBA - Worthen completed his undergraduate degree from Marquette's College of Communication

In late 2008, Worthen was the coach of the Generals, playing the bad guy role during the games. He ran such skits as using a "remote controlled" ball that the Globetrotters couldn't control, putting a piece of hard plastic on top the Globetrotters rim so they couldn't score and simply adding 30 or so points to the Generals' score by manipulating the scoreboard. At the end of games, he would lose a bet and was forced to wear a pink tutu and a tiara, and carry a shiny magic wand off the court.

Worthen started coaching in 1985 as a player/coach of the United States Basketball League's Springfield Fame guiding them to the league title.

Worthen and the New Haven Skyhawks won the 1988 USBL Championship. He has been the head coach of the Albany Patroons (CBA), Miami Tropics (USBL; 1987 Champions), New York Whitecaps (USBL), Harrisburg Hammerheads (CBA), Fort Wayne Fury (CBA), Long Island Surf (USBL), Brooklyn Kings (USBL), and Baltimore Bayrunners (IBL). Sam also was player coach of the Harlem Wizards show team for 15 years

Worthen was an assistant for three years 2004 through 2007 with the Iona College men's basketball program. He also was the assistant coach of the Fayetteville Patriots of the National Basketball Development League (NBDL).

References

External links
NBA career stats

1958 births
Living people
Albany Patroons players
All-American college men's basketball players
American men's basketball coaches
American men's basketball players
Basketball coaches from New York (state)
Basketball players from New York City
Charleston Gunners players
Chicago Bulls draft picks
Chicago Bulls players
Continental Basketball Association coaches
Junior college men's basketball players in the United States
Maine Windjammers players
Marquette Golden Eagles men's basketball players
McLennan Community College alumni
Puerto Rico Coquis players
Rochester Zeniths players
Shooting guards
Sportspeople from Brooklyn
United States Basketball League coaches
United States Basketball League players
Utah Jazz players
Washington Generals